Phi Psi is a professional fraternity in the field of textile arts and manufacturing engineering.

History
Its five Founders were:
 Harold H. Hart
 Charles A. Kalenbach
 Henry W. Eddy
 Robert M. Baeny
 Paul Benninghoffen

Established at the turn of the 20th Century, Phi Psi had three aims:
 to promote fellowship among men of textile colleges and universities with textile departments;
 to encourage high standards in textile work; and,
 to assist, by every honorable means, the advancement of its members.

The fraternity quickly expanded to several Massachusetts textile schools, then the center of textile manufacturing in the US. Its Beta chapter was formed at Southeastern Massachusetts (at Dartmouth, Massachusetts, and Gamma chapter at Lowell Tech, just a year after its national founding.

The nation's textile industry center, previously in New England, shifted to the southern states.  With this, chapters were opened in Georgia, North Carolina, South Carolina, Texas and Alabama.  A total of ten collegiate chapters were formed, and twelve alumni chapters.

Members from the Fraternity's Alpha chapter began a search for a national social fraternity to join. In what appears to be a friendly schism, a majority or all of its members formed a separate organization from Phi Psi, their original professional fraternity, on  when they were accepted as the Pennsylvania Omicron chapter of Sigma Phi Epsilon. Yet the Alpha chapter of Phi Psi continued independently on the campus, remaining active today. 

Chapter naming traditions may have diverged: the Gamma chapter at Lowell Tech may have inserted the Gamma from its name into its national name, calling itself the Phi Gamma Psi fraternity.

Traditions and insignia
Phi Psi's colors are black and gold.

The fraternity flower is the Yellow Tea Rose.

The official badge is described as a diamond-shaped emblem with a gold border and four perpendicular gold bars on a black face.

The quarterly publication is The Phi Psi Quarterly.

Chapters
Chapter information from Baird's Manual (20th), which at that time reported approximately 6,000 members. Apparently, some chapter names of the standard alphabetical order were not used. Active chapters noted in bold, inactive or merged chapters noted in italics.

Notes

See also
 Delta Kappa Phi, professional, textiles
 Professional fraternities and sororities
 Sigma Tau Sigma, honor society, textile engineering

References

Student organizations established in 1903
1903 establishments in Massachusetts
Textile arts
Textiles
Textile organizations